IK Oddevold is a Swedish football club located in Uddevalla, the name "Oddevold" being an older form of Uddevalla. The club, formed on 3 July 1932, currently plays in Sweden's third-flight league, Division 1. They play most of their home games at Rimnersvallen and they also have a newly built training facility called Thordéngården where they play most of their friendly games.

Season to season

* League restructuring in 2006 resulted in a new division being created at Tier 3 and subsequent divisions dropping a level.

Attendances

In recent seasons IK Oddevold have had the following average attendances:

* Attendances are provided in the Publikliga sections of the Svenska Fotbollförbundet website.

Players

Current squad
.

Management

Organisation
.

Technical staff
.

Achievements

League
 Division 1 Södra:
 Winners (1): 1995
 Runner-up (1): 2013
 Division 2 Västra Götaland:
 Winners (2): 2008, 2010
 Division 3 Nordvästra Götaland:
 Winners (1): 2003
 Runner-up (2): 2000, 2001

Club records
 Biggest league victory: 14–0 vs. Groheds IF in Division 6, 20 May 1951 
 Biggest league defeat: 0–6 vs. IFK Malmö in Division 2, 3 June 1963 
 Highest league placement: 14th in Allsvenskan, 1996
 Highest attendance: 10,605 vs. IFK Göteborg, 2 May 1996
 Most league appearances: 252,  Jan Kristiansson 1975–1987
 Most league goals:143,  Tommy Reinhardt 1967–1970, 1976–1982

External links

 IK Oddevold – Official Website

Footnotes

 
Allsvenskan clubs
Sport in Uddevalla
Football clubs in Västra Götaland County
Association football clubs established in 1932
1932 establishments in Sweden